Mahamadwadi Dam, (or Mohamod Wadi Dam) is an earthfill dam on Gad river near Nardave in Kankavli taluka of Sindhudurg district,  in the state of Maharashtra in India.

Specifications

Purpose
 Irrigation
 Hydroelectricity

See also
 Dams in Maharashtra
 List of reservoirs and dams in India

References

Dams in Sindhudurg district
Year of establishment missing